Atherosperma moschatum, the southern sassafras or blackheart sassafras, is an evergreen tree native to the cool temperate rainforests of Tasmania, Victoria, and New South Wales in Australia. It is common in the rainforests of Tasmania and Victoria, but more scattered and rare in the higher altitudes of eastern New South Wales. The northernmost area is at Mount Grundy, west of Port Macquarie.

Taxonomy
The southern sassafras was first described by French naturalist Jacques Labillardière in 1806, and was the only member of the genus Atherosperma. A subspecies, A. m. subsp. integrifolium, has been considered a separate species. Its generic name is derived from the Ancient Greek ather "awn", and sperma "seed", from the hairs on the fruit, and the specific epithet moschatum is the Latin adjective meaning "musk-scented", from the smell of the bark. It is a member of the small family Atherospermataceae along with several other Australian rainforest trees  including yellow sassafras (Doryphora sassafras).
. Its closest relative is the monotypic genus Nemuaron, endemic to New Caledonia.

Description
The southern sassafras is a small to medium-sized tree, growing around 6 to 25 m tall. However, in Tasmania, it can reach heights exceeding 40 m and a width of 1 m. It can be identified by the conical shape, the pale green leaves, and fragrant scent.

The bark is grey to light brown, with numerous lenticels, raised bumps and ridges. The leaves are 3 to 10 cm long and 8 to 25 mm wide, margins are coarsely toothed, but the northern population in Monga National Park, the Blue Mountains, Barrington Tops and at Mount Grundy has narrow, mostly entire leaves. Leaves, twigs, and flowers are fragrant, of a pleasant nutmeg scent.

Flowers form in winter, facing down to avoid rain and snow. White petalled, and yellow (and sometimes maroon) in the centre. The fruit capsules mature and open around January, releasing feathery wind blown seeds. Germination is unreliable. However, abundant new seedlings may unexpectedly form.

Distribution and habitat
Its distribution is from the Tia River west of Port Macquarie on the New South Wales midnorth coast through Victoria and Tasmania. It is found in the gullies and creek beds of high-altitude temperate rainforest, commonly associated with southern beeches of the genus Nothofagus, and mountain quandong (Elaeocarpus holopetalus).

Ecology
The smooth-barked A. moschatum does not shed its bark annually, and is a rich host of lichen species; a field study in Errinundra National Park found a total of 54 lichen species present, with 11 species found on trees of all sizes measured. The most commonly recorded was  Pannaria microphyllizans. These pockets of rainforest are thought to be critical refuges for populations of lichen species among fire-prone eucalyptus woodland.

Cultivation and uses

The timber is in demand for panelling, turnery, musical instruments, and other specialty work, (carvings, dishes, and boxes for tourists). The staining of the black heartwood is caused by fungus, and makes the timber markings particularly attractive.

The springy wood has been used for clothes pegs, and the scented bark is made into a beverage. It requires moisture and shade for cultivation, hence is not commonly seen cultivated.

It has been planted in the British Isles as far north as Northern Ireland and Scotland.

The leaves have a distinct scent and may be chewed to release a flavour and tingling sensation. However, the safety of the plants' consumption is not known and it may be poisonous.

See also
 Sassafras, Tasmania, a small town in North West Tasmania named after the local growth of southern sassafras.

References

 Forest Trees of Australia, D.J. Boland et al. 1992

External links

Atherospermataceae
Monotypic Laurales genera
Laurales of Australia
Trees of Australia
Flora of Tasmania
Flora of Victoria (Australia)
Flora of New South Wales
Trees of mild maritime climate
Tasmanian forests